Syed Shah Baba Hayder e Safdar Husayni Suhrawardi was a 12th-century Sufi saint of Suhrawardi order. He was the disciple of Syed Shah Mutaharuddin Suhrawardi of Tirchy. His mausoleum is located in Mulbagal, Kolar District, Karnataka.

Baba Hyder-e-Safdar Wali was original name was Syed Ismail who was a king of Sabhunat, Iran. After renouncing the world, he was inducted into Surwardy Sufi order by his spiritual master, Tabl-e-Aalam Badshah of Tirchy.

When Baba Hyder-e-Safdar came to India it was the regime of Ghiyas ud din Balban in Delhi and Halebeedu Hoysala in Southern India. He settled in Mulbagal along with 300 Qalandars and his companions, Haji Makki and Baba Syed Fatehullah Shaheed, and began to spread the word of the Suharwardy Order.

Baba died in 1269 (11th of Rajab, 668 Hijri). Baba Hyder-e-Safdar's first Urs sandal was anointed by Syedual Aaarifien Sultanul Masakin Qutubul Aqtaab Syed Khwaja Baba Fakhruddin of Penukonda who was also a disciple of Tabl-e-Aalam Badshah. Dargah of Baba Hyder Wali is revered as Saani chowk for Karnataka and Andhra Pradesh regions by fakirs and the abode of Baba Fakhruddin is Sadar Chowk for these regions. His mausoleum is visited by people of all faith and religion.

Urs of Baba Hyder-e-Safdar is celebrated every year on 11th of Rajab (according to Lunar calendar) which is attended with many people from various parts of India.

External links
Deccan Herald archive

12th-century births
1269 deaths
Sufi mystics